The 2023 Tokyo Marathon was the 16th edition of the annual marathon race in Tokyo, held on Sunday, .  A Platinum Label marathon, it was the first of six annual World Marathon Majors events to be held in 2023, and the only one of the six that has not announced the inclusion of a non-binary division for the year.  The field for the marathon was limited to 37,500 runners.

Results

Men

Women

References

External links 
 Official site

Marathon
2023 marathons
March 2023 sports events in Japan
2023
2023 in Japanese sport